Stenobothrus eurasius is a species of insect in the family Acrididae. It is found in Hungary and Romania.

References 

eurasius
Taxonomy articles created by Polbot